Flagg, Oregon, began as a railroad station on the Southern Pacific Line from Eugene to Coos Bay and later became an unincorporated community in Lane County, Oregon, United States, on Penn Road approximately  west of Vaughn. Wildcat Creek, a tributary of the Siuslaw River, flows by Flagg.

Flagg was named for L. Randolph Flagg, a railroad contractor.

References 

Unincorporated communities in Lane County, Oregon
Unincorporated communities in Oregon